A Bassoon quintet is a piece of chamber music for  bassoon and four other instruments, normally a string quartet.

Quintets for bassoon and string quartet include the Quintet by Graham Waterhouse,  compositions by Gordon Jacob and Franz Danzi, and works by Anton Reicha, including his Bassoon quintet and his Variations for bassoon and string quartet.

Notes

Chamber music
Compositions for bassoon